Demetris Assiotis (born March 31, 1971) is a Cypriot former international football midfielder.

He started and ended his career with Olympiakos Nicosia. He also played for Ethnikos Achna and Anorthosis Famagusta.

External links
 

1971 births
Living people
Cypriot footballers
Cyprus international footballers
Greek Cypriot people
Association football midfielders
Olympiakos Nicosia players
Ethnikos Achna FC players
Anorthosis Famagusta F.C. players
Nea Salamis Famagusta FC players
Aris Limassol FC players